Bellulia nepalensis is a moth of the family Erebidae first described by Michael Fibiger in 2008. It is known from Nepal.

References

Micronoctuini
Taxa named by Michael Fibiger
Moths described in 2008